The 2021 LKL Playoffs featured the eight best teams of the Lietuvos krepšinio lyga (LKL) basketball league in Lithuania, competing for the championship spot. This will be the LKL playoffs' 26th edition. Žalgiris achieved their 23rd title overall, eleven consecutive.

The quarter-finals will be played in a best-of-three format, with the higher seeded team playing the first and (if necessary) third game at home. The semi-finals and finals will be played in a best-of-five format, with the higher seed team playing games 1, 3 and 5 (if necessary) at home.

Notable events
 On 1 May 2021, Neptūnas made it to the playoffs after winning against Lietkabelis.
 On 2 May 2021, Rytas secured the second place in the table and their place in the playoffs after winning the match against Šiauliai.
 On 6 May 2021, the schedule for the playoffs was announced. The quarter-final stage will begin on May 12, and the semi-final stage will begin on May 20. The small final series is scheduled for June 2, June 5 and June 8. The final series dates are June 3, June 6 and June 9.
 On 15 May 2021, Žalgiris and Juventus became the first teams to reach the Betsafe-LKL semi-finals and formed the first pair of semi-finals. Žalgiris won the series 2-0 against Pieno žvaigždės. Juventus grabbed a difficult victory against Cbet Prienai and won the series with the result 2-0. The first match between these teams will take place on 20 May.
 On 16 May 2021, Lietkabelis became the third semi-final team and won the series 2-0 against Neptūnas. That means Neptūnas season is over.
 On 22 May 2021, Rytas became fourth semi-final team and won the series 2–0 against Šiauliai. Šiauliai season is over.
 On 29 May 2021, Žalgiris became first finalist and won the series 3-0 against Juventus. Juventus will play for 3rd place.
 On 7 June 2021, the last match of the Betsafe-LKL final series took place. Žalgiris won the Betsafe-LKL title, it is already the 23rd Žalgiris title and the 11th consecutive title.

Qualified teams
<onlyinclude>

Bracket

Quarter-finals

|}

Quarter-finals Game 1

Quarter-finals Game 2

Semi-finals

|}

Semi-finals Game 1

Semi-finals Game 2

Semi-finals Game 3

Third place 

|}

Third-place game 1

Third-place game 2

Third-place game 3

Third-place game 4

Third-place game 5

Final 

|}

Final Game 1

Final Game 2

Final Game 3

See also
2019–20 LKL season

References

External links
 LKL website

2020–21 LKL season
Lietuvos krepšinio lyga playoffs